Peter Kajlinger (born 2 December 1964) is a Swedish operatic baritone. Kajlinger grew up in a family of musicians. He made his debut in La Bohème at the Royal Swedish Opera in Stockholm at the age of 11.

Career
He entered the College of Opera in Stockholm in 1989 and performed as Moralés (Carmen) and Leporello (Don Giovanni) at the Royal Swedish Opera. Upon graduation in 1992, he sang the role of Falstaff by Salieri at Drottningholm Court Theatre. Pamela Rosenberg, then casting director of Staatsoper Stuttgart, noticed his performances as Leporello and Figaro and invited him to join the company. At Staatsoper Stuttgart, he sang more than twenty roles.
 
He performed as Figaro at GöteborgsOperan in 2000. He became a freelance singer in 2003 with recitals as Masetto (Don Giovanni), Michelotto (Die Gezeichneten), Antonio (Le Nozze di Figaro) at Staatsoper Stuttgart and as Don Carlo (La forza del Destino) at Södertäljeoperan. Kajlinger originated the role of Mr. Verloc in Simon Wills' opera, (The Secret Agent), in 2006 at Feldkircher Musikfestival.
 
He sang Amonasro (Aida) at Opera på Skäret in 2007 and Major Domo in Tjajkovskij's Pique Dame at Oper der Stadt Bonn. He performed as Scarpia (Tosca) in 2008 and as Rigoletto at Värmlandsoperan in 2009. He was Marcello (La Bohème) at Opera på Skäret in 2010. He was praised as Dr. Treeves in the worldpremiere of The Elephant Man at Norrlandsoperan 2012. At Wermland Opera he sang Bartolo and Pizarro in the Trilogy directed by Tobias Kratzer 2014-2015. In 2017 he portrayed the Captain in Bohuslav Martinu´s The Greek Passion. He played the main character in The Emperor´s New Clothes at  Norrlandsoperan 2021

Discography
 Jan-Åke Hillerud: Slaget om Dungen
 Luigi Nono: Al gran sole carico d'amore  
 Staffan Odenhall: Purpurbit

Filmography
Christina, 1988, Directed by Göran Järvefelt

Sources
 Brüggemann, Axel, Stuttgart entdeckt „Masaniello furioso“, Die Welt,  12 February 2001 (in German) 
 Dahlberg, Mats, Tysk trio skapar banbrytande Verdiopera i Karlstad, Nya Wermlands-Tidningen, 23 October 2009 (in Swedish)
 Wermland Operan biography (Wermland Opera),, (in Swedish)
 Wurzel, Christoph, Online Musik Magazin (in German)

References

Rigoletto naket intressant i Karlstad, sverigesradio.se
The elephant man: Norrlandsoperan, expressen.se
Operatrilogi med problem, aftonbladet.se
SEEN AND HEARD INTERNATIONAL OPERA REVIEW, musicweb-international.com

External links
 Official website
 
 

University College of Opera alumni
Living people
Operatic baritones
1964 births